Queensland Soldiers' Comforts Fund, a working subdivision of the Australian Comforts Fund, was established during World War I. The purpose of the Fund was to provide comforts to soldiers on active service. This was achieved via appeals for donations, public subscriptions, and organising fundraising activities. Numerous branches of the Queensland Soldiers' Comforts Fund were spread throughout Queensland,  Australia during this period.

Formation 

Queensland Soldiers' Comforts Fund was inaugurated at a public meeting convened by the Mayoress of Brisbane on 21 September 1915. A committee for the fund was formed with Lady Goold-Adams, wife of the Governor of Queensland Sir Hamilton John Goold-Adams, elected as patroness, and Lady Cowley, wife of former politician Sir Alfred Cowley, appointed president. Premises for the operation of the Queensland Soldiers' Comforts Fund was secured at Panbury House in Eagle Street, Brisbane.

Comfort packages 
One of the committee's first activities was to appeal for public donations of various items that could be dispatched to soldiers overseas in time for Christmas. Accepted items included shirts, undershirts with short sleeves, mufflers, balaclava caps, handkerchiefs, writing pads, envelopes, pencils, pipes, tobacco, cigarettes, bootlaces, toothbrushes, toothpaste, soap, Vaseline, sweets, coffee, games, books and magazines.

By the end of World War I, the Queensland Soldiers' Comfort Fund declared that since October 1915 they had packed and shipped 5,010 cases to soldiers overseas, which included 17,324 shirts and 37,983 pairs of socks.

Branches 
Queensland Soldiers' Comforts Fund established a number of branches outside of their main Brisbane office. These included Ayr, Beaudesert, Beerwah, Benaraby, Bowen, Bundaberg, Caboolture, Calliope Valley, Charters Towers, Degilbo, Emu Creek, Eumundi, Goondiwindi, Ipswich, Isis Girls' Club, Kedron, Laidley, Lake Clarendon, Longreach, Many Peaks, Mapleton, Maroochy River, Maroon, Memerambi, Mitchell, Morven, Mount Morgan, Nambour, Nanango, Ormiston, Poona, Pialba, Sandgate, Tallebudgera, Townsville, Tiaro, Toogoolawah, Warra, Wattle Branch and Wynnum.

Fundraising initiatives 
Queensland Soldiers' Comfort Fund oversaw several fundraising operations.

Coo-ee Cafe 
The Coo-ee Cafe was a volunteer-run cafe initially situated in the basement of the Brisbane Club building in Adelaide Street, Brisbane, before moving to the ground floor. The cafe was in operation between 6 February 1917 and 23 November 1918. During this period over £7,600 (approximately 40 percent of profits made by the cafe) were contributed to various comforts funds.

War-time Kitchen 
War-time Kitchen in Southport, Queensland was opened in September 1917 and operated by volunteers. The kitchen sold home-made cakes, sweets, jams and pickles. Seventy-five percent of profits made went towards the Queensland Soldiers' Comforts Fund, averaging £40 per month.

Jam Shop 
Situated in a shop in the Podmore and Hall building in Adelaide Street, Brisbane, the Jam Shop sold home-made jams and pickles to the public. The shop averaged £25 per month of profits for the Fund.

Refreshment stall at the Brisbane Exhibition 
During the annual Brisbane Exhibition at the Exhibition Grounds in 1917 and 1918, the Queensland Soldiers' Comforts Fund maintained its own refreshment stall, selling sandwiches, fruit and soft drinks with proceeds going toward the Fund. The stall realized profits of £301 and £640 respectively.

References

Further reading 
 OM73-29, Queensland Soldiers' Comforts Fund Records, John Oxley Library, State Library of Queensland
 10004 Presentation Address to Marie Cowley 1919, John Oxley Library, State Library of Queensland
 Report of the work done by the Queensland Soldiers' Comforts Fund, 1915-1919. Brisbane: C.J. Walker. 1919

Queensland in World War I
20th century in Queensland